Garrick Sherman (born August 18, 1990) is an American basketball player. Sherman plays as center or power forward.

College career
Sherman started his collegiate career with Michigan State Spartans men's basketball in 2009. He didn't play in the 2011–12 season, and transferred to Notre Dame Fighting Irish men's basketball after the season he sat out.

Professional career
On July 30, 2014, Sherman signed with AZS Koszalin in Poland. On January 29, 2015, he was released by the team.

On February 5, 2015, he signed with BC Dinamo Tbilisi in Georgia and finished the 2014–15 season here. He averaged 16.3 points and 8.1 rebounds in 16 games for Dinamo.

In May 2015, he signed a 1-year deal with Donar Groningen in the Netherlands. Sherman and Donar parted ways on November 23, 2015. He immediately signed with Jászberényi KSE in Hungary.

Statistics

References

External links
Notre Dame bio

1990 births
Living people
American expatriate basketball people in Hungary
American expatriate basketball people in Poland
American expatriate basketball people in the Netherlands
Basketball players from Ohio
Centers (basketball)
Donar (basketball club) players
Dutch Basketball League players
Michigan State Spartans men's basketball players
Notre Dame Fighting Irish men's basketball players
American men's basketball players